Iwa Wanja (10 October 1905 – 26 June 1991) was a Bulgarian actress based in Germany. She moved to Berlin to pursue her career, appearing in around thirty German films. Married to Norbert Schultze, German composer, best remembered for having written the melody of the World War II classic Lili Marleen.

Life and career
In 1937, Wanja appeared in the Nazi propaganda film, Urlaub auf Ehrenwort (Holiday on Parole, also known as Furlough on Parole).

Sometime around 1943, she wed German film composer Norbert Arnold Wilhelm Richard Shultze. They had two sons together. During their marriage, she penned the libretti for several of his compositions for the stage.

Selected filmography
 Women of Luxury (1925)
 A Sister of Six (1926)
 The Woman's Crusade (1926)
 I Liked Kissing Women (1926)
 Weekend Magic (1927)
 The Long Intermission (1927)
 The Marriage Nest (1927)
 The Prince's Child (1927)
 Girls, Beware! (1928)
 The President (1928)
 The House Without Men (1928)
 Polish Economy (1928)
 Dear Homeland (1929)
 The Right of the Unborn (1929)
 From a Bachelor's Diary (1929)
 Josef the Chaste (1930)
 The Court Concert (1936)
 Captain Bay-Bay (1953)
 A Life for Do (1954)

References

Bibliography
 Bernadette Kester. Film Front Weimar: Representations of the First World War in German Films of the Weimar Period (1919-1933). Amsterdam University Press, 2003.

External links

1905 births
1991 deaths
Bulgarian film actresses
Bulgarian silent film actresses
Bulgarian emigrants to Germany
People from Karnobat